Dianne Ruth Pettis (1955 – 13 May 2008) was a novelist and journalist from New Zealand.

Background 
Pettis was born in Waipawa, Hawke's Bay, New Zealand. In addition to her novels, poetry, and short stories, she worked as a journalist, a script writer for the Natural History Unit and a communications manager.

Works

Novels 
 Like Small Bones (2004)
 The First Touch of Light (2009)

Poetry 
Pettis' poetry and short fiction have been included in Landfall, Sport and Takahe, and broadcast on Radio New Zealand. Her work was also included in:
 Under Flagstaff: and Anthology of Dunedin Poetry (2004), edited by Robin Law
 Swings and Roundabouts (2008), edited by Emma Neale

Awards 
Like Small Bones, was shortlisted for the Best First Book section in the Asia Pacific region for the Commonwealth Writers’ Prize. In 2006 she was awarded the Robert Burns Fellowship, a literary residency at the University of Otago in Dunedin, New Zealand.

References 

1967 births
2008 deaths
New Zealand fiction writers
New Zealand women novelists
New Zealand women poets
People from Waipawa